Michelangelo Borriello (23 April 1909 – 6 September 1995) was an Italian sports shooter. He competed at the 1936, 1948, 1952 and 1956 Summer Olympics.

References

External links
 

1909 births
1995 deaths
Italian male sport shooters
Olympic shooters of Italy
Shooters at the 1936 Summer Olympics
Shooters at the 1948 Summer Olympics
Shooters at the 1952 Summer Olympics
Shooters at the 1956 Summer Olympics
Sportspeople from Rome